Maksim Olegovich Pichugin (born 5 November 1998) is a Russian football player. He plays for FC Rodina-M Moscow.

Club career
He made his debut in the Russian Football National League for FC Khimki on 17 May 2017 in a game against FC Sokol Saratov.

References

External links
 
 Profile by Russian Football National League

1998 births
People from Khimki
Living people
Russian footballers
Association football forwards
FC Khimki players
FC Baltika Kaliningrad players
FC Dynamo Bryansk players
Sportspeople from Moscow Oblast